Brearley Cemetery, founded in 1847, is the oldest cemetery in the city of Dardanelle, Arkansas.  It is located on the north side of Arkansas Highway 27, west of its junction with Arkansas Highway 22.  The cemetery, still in active use, houses more than 2,000 burials, many of the descendants of the early Czech immigrants to the area.  One marker, possibly a memorial marker, bears the date 1780, but its provenance and significance has not been established.  A  section on the eastern side of the cemetery, where its oldest burials are located, was listed on the National Register of Historic Places in 2007.

An active cemetery, some of the notable burials include:
 Thomas Boles (1837–1905), US Congressman
 Bonnie Jean Brown (1938–2016), Singer
 Jack Zeller (1883–1969), Baseball executive

See also
 National Register of Historic Places listings in Yell County, Arkansas

References

External links
  – NRPH-listed cemetery
  – Nearby small fenced cemetery

Cemeteries on the National Register of Historic Places in Arkansas
National Register of Historic Places in Yell County, Arkansas
Cultural infrastructure completed in 1847
1847 establishments in Arkansas
Czech-American culture
Dardanelle, Arkansas
Cemeteries established in the 1840s